Giorgio Koukl (born 1953, Prague, Czech Republic) with family  roots going back to Belarusian noble family of Grigori Minaiev, is a composer, pianist and musical journalist who lives in Lugano, a town located in Ticino, an Italian-speaking canton of southern Switzerland.

Through studies with Rudolf Firkušný, Nikita Magaloff, Stanislav Neuhaus and Carlo Vidusso, Koukl was first introduced to the piano music of Bohuslav Martinů.  Koukl, defined by the review "Art Music Lounge" as one of the five or six best pianists of the world is now considered as one of the major world specialists of Parisian music of the twenties and of the "silver age" composers from Saint Petersburg, has recorded the only one existing complete set of solo piano music of Martinů, released between November 2006 and August 2009, a 5-CD set of complete vocal music of Martinů  and a 2-CD set of Martinů's complete piano and orchestra for Naxos Records.
A series of eight CDs of the complete solo piano music of Alexander Tcherepnin added to his discography the valuations as best CD of the month (four times), best CD of the year (2 times), so as  the recordings of Vítězslava Kaprálová, Paul Le Flem (French prize Diapason d'Or),  Witold Lutoslawski (first world recordings), Arthur Lourié (first world recording), Tibor Harsanyi, (a project completed in January 2021, all first world recording), Carl Maria von Weber, Johannes Brahms, Alfons Szczerbiński and Alexandre Tansman. Recently he released the first volume  of the complete piano and two pianos work recording of Vittorio Rieti and is working on a new release of violin and piano music of the Tcherepnin family.

References

External links 
 Giorgio Koukl's website

Czech composers
Czech male composers
Czech pianists
Czech harpsichordists
Swiss composers
Swiss male composers
Swiss pianists
Swiss harpsichordists
Musicians from Prague
Czech expatriates in Switzerland
1953 births
Living people
Male pianists
21st-century pianists
21st-century Czech male musicians